Sphecodemyia is a genus of flies in the family Tabanidae.

Species
Sphecodemyia gromieri Oldroyd, 1957
Sphecodemyia infuscata Oldroyd, 1957
Sphecodemyia lamborni Austen, 1937
Sphecodemyia natalensis Oldroyd, 1957
Sphecodemyia secunda Austen, 1937

References

Brachycera genera
Tabanidae
Diptera of Africa
Taxa named by Ernest Edward Austen